The siege of Baghdad (1733) was a relatively short but intense siege of Ottoman-held Baghdad by the Persian army under Nader. The outcome was determined not at Baghdad but ultimately far to the north near Samara where a large relief force commanded by the Topal Pasha inflicted a decisive defeat on Nader's Persian army (the only battlefield defeat of Nader's career). The Persian besiegers were forced away with the loss of most of their equipment and saving a much exhausted garrison desperate for relief.

Commencement of the siege 
Ahmad Pasha, the governor of the Baghdad Eyalat, cautiously held to the left bank of the Tigris knowing what a formidable barrier it posed to the invading Persian army. Nader camped on the east side and resorted to a ruse whereby he would fool the Ottomans by keeping a large portion of his men in and around the camp but only to gather a small hand-picked group of soldiers to march north under the cover of night.

On February 15 Nader crossed the Tigris with 2,500 and immediately moved south with another 1,500 men managing to make the crossing to follow Nader just before the bridge over the river collapsed into it. Ahmad Pasha accelerated his force up the Tigris as soon as he heard of the Persian contingent's presence on the left bank of the river. Nader's small band included three fowj of Kurdish (each "fowj" being a unit of 1,000 soldiers), Turcomen and Abdali Afghan troops which he formed up against a formidable Ottoman assault containing artillery, cavalry and janissaries (infantry).

The Turcomen and Kurds were driven back but the Abdali held long enough for the 1,500 men that crossed the Tigris before the collapse of the bridge to come from the north. Nader drew them up in formation and fed them into the battle, gradually pushing Ahmad pasha's line back until it was broken and the remnants fled towards Baghdad leaving many guns and corpses behind. Nader ordered some of the Kurds and Turcomen hanged for their cowardice in the face of danger and conversely rewarded the Abdali.

The environs of Baghdad were soon swarming with Persian soldiers as they joined their comrades from the east bank of the Tigris and began a colossal effort constructing 2,700 towers around the perimeter of the city. It is estimated that a total of 300,000 Persians were besieging the walls of Baghdad although just a 100,000 of them were soldiers.

Topal Osman Pasha arrives 
The outcome of the siege however was decided many miles to the north of Baghdad near a city called Samarra where Istanbul had sent the best army it could muster under the command of the best general it had: Topal Osman Pasha. Nader arrogantly marched north to attack the Ottoman relief force instead of choosing a suitable battlefield for a defensive battle. The result was one of the most bloody engagements of Nader's campaigns with almost half the Persian army becoming 'hors de combat' with even the Ottomans losing a quarter of their army leaving a terrifying 20,000 men as casualties of the debacle.

The battle was in fact so crushingly decisive that it forced the Persian from Ottoman Iraq altogether, saving Baghdad from certain capture by Persia.
Although Nader would make a miraculous comeback from his defeat, destroying Topal Pasha's army, he still failed to capture Baghdad in his subsequent campaign (mainly because of an insurrection in southern Persia which required his immediate presence).

See also 
Battle of Samara
Battle of Agh-Darband
Nader Shah
Topal Osman Pasha

References

Sources 
 Moghtader, Gholam-Hussein (2008). The Great Batlles of Nader Shah, Donyaye Ketab
 Axworthy, Michael (2009). The Sword of Persia: Nader Shah, from tribal warrior to conquering tyrant, I. B. Tauris 
 Ghafouri, Ali (2008). History of Iran's wars: from the Medes to now, Etela'at Publishing

Ottoman–Persian War (1730–1735)
1733 in military history
1733 in the Ottoman Empire
1733 in Iran
Ottoman history of Baghdad
Sieges of Baghdad
Battles involving Safavid Iran
Baghdad, 1733
Campaigns of Nader Shah